Elements CRM iOS is a Mac Customer Relationship Management (Mac CRM) solution built by Ntractive for Apple business using Apple devices. Offered as a Cloud computing subscription-based service, Elements CRM iOS is a universal mobile app for the iPhone and iPad. Elements CRM iOS is an add-on to the Elements CRM desktop app. The iPad CRM version of Elements CRM iOS looks, works and feels like the desktop app. The iPhone CRM app is a limited version of the most important functions of the desktop app.

History

Ntractive 
Ntractive is a privately held software development company based in Grand Forks, North Dakota that markets business software to small to medium-sized companies. Established in 2006, the company's sole product is Elements CRM, a customer relationship management application aimed at small businesses that use Mac OS X computers, iPads and iPhones. 

Elements CRM is a cloud based app that employs a unique site-specific browser to merge OS X desktop and web application functionality. The product was first introduced to the public at a keynote address during Apple's 2007 World Wide Developer's Conference. The official launch of Elements SBM (the product's original name) 1.0 took place at Macworld/iWorld 2009. The product was then renamed Elements CRM and with its 2.0 release was awarded the honor of Apple "Staff Pick" in July, 2009.

Methodology

Mac CRM 
Mac Customer Relationship Management (Mac CRM) is an approach to managing a company's interaction with current and future customers on Apple Inc Desktop computers and iOS devices only. Mac CRM solutions are not web-based only applications that use a web browser for interaction. Instead, a Mac CRM is a combination of a cloud based app built with Apple's programming language Objective-C or Swift (programming language). Mac CRMs involve using Apple only devices and technology to organize, automate, and synchronize sales, marketing, customer service, and technical support.

References

Cloud computing
Cloud infrastructure
Business software for macOS
IOS software
Macintosh software companies
Customer relationship management software
Cloud applications
ERP software companies
ERP software